The CZ P-10 C is a compact semi-automatic striker-fired pistol made by Česká zbrojovka (CZ) in the Czech Republic. It was introduced in 2017 after development that began in 2014. The weapon is designed for self-defense and use in the armed forces.

It has a mechanically and thermally stable polymer frame reinforced with glass fiber and three interchangeable backstraps. Magazines are backward compatible with CZ P-07 but not vice versa.

The pistol is a direct competitor to the Glock 19. The guns have very similar characteristics but Glock is about  lighter, is about  shorter and has a different grip angle.

History
The P-10 C is the first partially precocked, striker-fired pistol manufactured by CZ. The C in the name stands for compact. Ergonomics of the P-10 C are similar to that of the CZ 75 with a newly engineered trigger system to make it "more efficient and easier to handle."

Design details
The P-10 C is a striker-fired semi-automatic pistol. This type of trigger system prevents the firearm from discharging unless the trigger is fully depressed, even if the pistol is dropped. Other safety features include a firing pin block which mechanically obstructs the firing pin. This pistol does not feature a magazine disconnect which prevents it from being fired when the magazine is withdrawn. 
 
The frame is made out of a fiber-reinforced polymer while the slide is made of steel. The slide and magazine releases are ambidextrous. The barrel is cold hammer-forged steel with a black nitride finish. The pistol sights are iron with a three-dot system that become night sights after being exposed to light.

The trigger guard is large to fit a variety of finger widths and to allow for shooting while wearing gloves. The trigger guard is undercut for a more ergonomic fit. Additional ergonomic features include three different backstrap sizes, stippling on all four sides of the grip and near the slide release, and a "deep saddle just underneath of the slide."

The P-10 C factory trigger has a short reset which is tactile and audible.

A new P-10 C pistol from CZ comes in a lockable plastic case with a carrying handle, three backstraps, two 15-round magazines, a cable lock, cleaning brush and rod, and the owner's manual. The grips are polymer and come in three different sizes; they slide on a rail and a pin locks the grip to the frame.

On Optics Ready (OR) models the slide comes with a plate to cover the milling if no optics are added. The rear sights and viewfinder were updated for better shooting accuracy, and the originally ambidextrous magazine release buttons have been replaced by one larger button that with the help of tools can be reversed.

CZ introduced a full size model (P-10 F) and subcompact (P-10 S) of the P-10 in October 2018. While the P-10C has a  barrel, the full size model has a  barrel and the subcompact has a  barrel. The full size model holds 19+1 cartridges and the subcompact holds 12+1 cartridges. Like the new P-10 C model introduced in September, they both are optics ready.

Its single-stack magazine holds 7+1 cartridges.

Users 

Army of the Czech Republic

Central Anticorruption Bureau—100
Customs Service—around several dozen.
Straż Graniczna—1600 examples on order with an option for 600 more.

Awards 
The CZ P-10 C has been awarded the Pistol of the Year 2017 prize by Guns & Ammo magazine.

References

External links
 Official page
 Instruction Manual CZ P-10 

Police weapons
9mm Parabellum semi-automatic pistols
.40 S&W semi-automatic pistols